Kõrksaar is an island belonging to the country of Estonia.

See also
 List of islands of Estonia

Islands of Estonia
Lääneranna Parish